Keisler is a surname. Notable people with the surname include:

 Howard Jerome Keisler (born 1936), American mathematician 
 Peter Keisler (born 1960), American lawyer 
 Randy Keisler (born 1976), American baseball pitcher

See also
Deborah Keisler born in 2008 

 Kesler
 Kiesler